European route E43 is an E-road going from Bellinzona in Switzerland over Chur, Switzerland and Ulm, Germany to Würzburg, Germany.

External links 

 UN Economic Commission for Europe: Overall Map of E-road Network (2007)

E043
E043
43